The 1970 United States Senate elections was an election for the United States Senate. It took place on November 3, with the 33 seats of Class 1 contested in regular elections. Special elections were also held to fill vacancies. These races occurred in the middle of Richard Nixon's first term as president. The Democrats lost a net of three seats, while the Republicans and the Conservative Party of New York picked up one net seat each, and former Democrat Harry F. Byrd Jr. was re-elected as an independent.

This was the first time that Republicans gained Senate seats while losing House seats, which also occurred in 2018. This also occurred for Democrats in 1914, 1962, and 2022.

This was the most recent election in which a third party won a seat in the Senate until 2006. , this is also the most recent cycle in which Democrats won Senate elections in Utah and Wyoming, and the most recent in which Republicans won a Senate election in Hawaii.

Results summary

Source: Office of the Clerk

Getting out the vote
President Nixon said that rather than violent protests, the best way for the American public to get their opinion heard was by voting:

Gains, losses, and holds

Retirements
One Republican and three Democrats retired instead of seeking re-election.

Defeats
Three Republicans and four Democrats sought re-election but lost in the primary or general election.

Party switches
One Democrat ran as an Independent in the general election.

Change in composition

Before the elections

After the elections

Race summary

Special elections during the 91st Congress 
In these special elections, the winner was seated during 1970 or before January 3, 1971; ordered by election date, then state.

Elections leading to the next Congress 
In these general elections, the winners were elected for the term beginning January 3, 1971; ordered by state.

All of the elections involved the Class 1 seats.

Closest races 
Fourteen races had a margin of victory under 10%:

Alaska (special) 

Republican Ted Stevens was appointed December 24, 1968 to finish the term of Democrat Bob Bartlett, who had died in office. The open primary was held August 25, 1970, in which Stevens received 40,411 votes (55.91%), Key received 29,459 votes (23.94%), State senator Joe Josephson received 12,730 votes (18.22%) and Fritz Singer (R) received 1,349 votes (1.93%). In the November 3, 1970 special election to finish the term, he ran against the Democratic Speaker of the Alaska House of Representatives Wendell P. Kay.  Stevens easily won with almost 60% of the vote.

Arizona 

Incumbent Republican Paul Fannin decided to run for re-election to a second term, running unopposed in the Republican primary. Fannin defeated Democratic businessman Sam Grossman in the general election.

California

Connecticut

Republican Lowell P. Weicker Jr. defeated Democrat Joseph Duffey and incumbent Thomas J. Dodd who ran this time as an independent. Dodd entered the race at the last minute and split the Democratic vote, allowing Weicker to win with only 42% of the vote.

Delaware 

Four-term Republican John J. Williams decided to retire, rather than run for re-election. Republican William Roth easily defeated Democrat Jacob Zimmerman by a margin of eighteen percentage points, and went on to serve thirty years in the Senate.

Florida 

Incumbent Democrat Spessard Holland retired instead of seeking a fifth term. During the Democratic primary, former Governor C. Farris Bryant and State senator Lawton Chiles advanced to a run-off, having received more votes than Speaker of the Florida House of Representatives Frederick H. Schultz, attorney Alcee Hastings, and State Representative Joel T. Daves, III. Chiles soundly defeated Bryant in the run-off election, scoring a major upset due to his comparatively small name recognition prior to the election.

The Republican primary exposed an in-party feud between Governor Claude R. Kirk Jr. and U.S. Representative William C. Cramer. In the election, Cramer handily defeated G. Harrold Carswell and body shop owner George Balmer; the former was a Fifth Circuit Court of Appeals judge favored by Kirk and had been rejected as a Supreme Court of the United States nominee a few months prior to the primary. Chiles won the election by a relatively small margin of 7.8%, receiving 902,438 votes against Cramer's 772,817 votes.

Incumbent Spessard Holland, who served in the Senate since 1946, decided to retire rather than seek a fifth term. Although the Democratic Party had dominated state elections since the Reconstruction Era, Claude R. Kirk Jr. and Edward Gurney, both Republicans, were elected senator and Governor in 1966 and 1968, respectively.

Hawaii

Illinois (special) 

A special election was held to fill the remainder of the term of Republican Everett Dirksen, who had died in office. Republican Ralph Tyler Smith had been appointed to fill the seat after Dirksen's death, and he lost the special election to Democrat Adlai Stevenson III.

Indiana

Maine

Maryland

Massachusetts 

Incumbent Democrat Ted Kennedy defeated his challengers.  This was Kennedy's first election run since the 1969 Chappaquiddick incident. Kennedy won 62.2%, down from 74.3% that he won in the previous election in 1964; this decrease was due to numerous factors including Chappaquiddick and a far more favorable environment for the Republicans than the Democratic landslide year of 1964.

The Republican nominee was Josiah Spaulding, a businessman and Republican leader in Massachusetts. He led a group of delegates at the 1968 Republican National Convention who unsuccessfully sought to nominate Nelson A. Rockefeller over Richard Nixon.

Other candidates were Lawrence Gilfedder (Socialist Labor) and Mark R. Shaw (Prohibition), a former Prohibition Party candidate for U.S. senator from Massachusetts in 1946, 1952, 1958, 1969, 1962, and 1966. He was the party's candidate for governor of Massachusetts in 1948 and 1956. In 1964, he was the Prohibition Party's candidate for vice-president of the United States.

Michigan

Minnesota 

Incumbent Democrat Eugene McCarthy retired instead of seeking a third term. Former Democratic U.S. senator, Vice President and 1968 presidential nominee Hubert Humphrey defeated Republican U.S. Representative Clark MacGregor.

Mississippi

Missouri

Montana 

Democratic incumbent Mike Mansfield, the Senate Majority Leader who was first elected to the Senate in 1952, and was re-elected in 1958 and 1964, ran for re-election. Mansfield won the primary against several opponents, and advanced to the general election, where he was opposed by Harold E. Wallace, a sporting goods salesman and the Republican nominee. While his margin of victory decreased slightly from 1964, Mansfield still managed to defeat Wallace overwhelmingly, winning his fourth and (what would turn out to be his) final term in the Senate.

Nebraska 

The incumbent Republican Roman Hruska was re-elected.

Nevada 

Democrat Howard Cannon, the incumbent since 1959, won re-election to a third term over William Raggio, the Washoe County District Attorney.

In the Senate, Cannon was known as a moderate in the Democratic Party. He served as chairman of several committees, including the rules committee and the inaugural arrangements committee. Cannon was nearly defeated for re-election in 1964 by Republican Lieutenant Governor Paul Laxalt in one of the closest election in history. However, he became more popular over the next few years and defeated D.A. William Raggio, whose 1970 senate campaign began his long political career. Raggio ran for the Nevada Senate in 1972 and won. He then served there for decades to come.

New Jersey

New Mexico 

Incumbent Democrat Joseph Montoya successfully ran for re-election to a second term, defeating Republican Anderson Carter.

New York 

Incumbent Republican Charles Goodell, who was recently appointed to the seat by Governor Nelson Rockefeller after senator Bobby Kennedy (D) was assassinated, ran for a full term, but was defeated by the Conservative Party of New York nominee James L. Buckley.  Other candidates included: Richard Ottinger, U.S. Congressman (1965–1971, 1975–1985), Kevin P. McGovern, Paul O'Dwyer, Former New York City Council Member from Manhattan, Ted Sorensen, Former Advisor and Speechwriter to President John F. Kennedy, Richard D. McCarthy, U.S. Congressman (1965-1971).

North Dakota 

Incumbent Democratic-NPL Party Senator Quentin N. Burdick was re-elected to his third term, defeating Republican candidate Thomas S. Kleppe, who later became the United States Secretary of the Interior.

Only Burdick filed as a Dem-NPLer, and the endorsed Republican candidate was Thomas S. Kleppe, who was finishing his second and final term as a Representative for North Dakota's second congressional district. Burdick and Kleppe won the primary elections for their respective parties.

One independent candidate, Russell Kleppe, also filed before the deadline.

Ohio

Pennsylvania 

Incumbent Republican Hugh Scott won re-election, defeating Democratic nominee State senator William Sesler.

Rhode Island

Tennessee 

Republican Bill Brock defeated incumbent senator Albert Gore Sr.

Texas 

Incumbent Democrat Ralph Yarborough was defeated by former Representative Lloyd Bentsen in the Democratic primary. Bentsen then defeated Representative George H. W. Bush in the general election. When Bush was running for President in 1988, his Democratic opponent, Massachusetts Governor Michael Dukakis, selected Bentsen as his vice presidential running mate.

Utah

Vermont

Virginia 

Incumbent Harry F. Byrd Jr. was re-elected to his first full term after winning a race 4 years earlier to finish the remainder of his father's term.  He beat George C. Rawlings Jr. (D), a former member of the Virginia House of Delegates, and Ray L. Garland (R), a member of Virginia House of Delegates.

Washington

West Virginia

Wisconsin

Wyoming

See also
 1970 United States elections
 1970 United States gubernatorial elections
 1970 United States House of Representatives elections
 91st United States Congress
 92nd United States Congress

Notes

References